"Good Rhymes" is the debut single by UK garage group Da Click, released in late 1998. It was produced by DJ Pied Piper, and features rapping from the MCs Creed, PSG and Unknown MC, and singing from Valerie M. A top 20 hit, the song peaked at No. 14 on the UK Singles Chart and No. 2 on the UK Dance Singles Chart in January 1999.

The song interpolates the bassline and chorus of the 1979 Chic hit "Good Times", as well as interpolating vocals from Luther Vandross' "Never Too Much" during PSG's part in the second verse.

Track listing
UK 12" single
A1. "Good Rhymes" (Original Mix) - 5:54
B1. "Good Rhymes" (Blockster Delight Mix) - 6:40
B2. "Baad Rhymes" (Hip Hop (Re) Flex) - 4:16

Australia & New Zealand CD maxi-single (1999, Tinted Records)
 "Good Rhymes" (Blockster Delight Edit) - 3:37
 "Good Rhymes" (Original 2 Step Radio Mix) - 3:20
 "Good Rhymes" (Blockster Delight 12" Mix) - 6:41
 "Good Rhymes" (NMCB Feel Da Filter Funk 12") - 7:08
 "Good Rhymes" (Live @ Liberty (Coloseum)) - 5:57
 "Baad Rhymes" (Hip Hop (Re)Flex) - 4:18

References

1998 songs
1998 debut singles
Songs written by Bernard Edwards
Songs written by Nile Rodgers
UK garage songs
FFRR Records singles